Oncideres guttulata is a species of beetle in the family Cerambycidae. It was described by James Thomson in 1868. It is known from Argentina, Brazil and Uruguay. It feeds on Acacia caven and Vachellia farnesiana.

References

guttulata
Beetles described in 1868